Scopula ophthalmica is a moth of the  family Geometridae. It is found on Sulawesi.

References

Moths described in 1920
ophthalmica
Moths of Indonesia